New Wave (Novaya volna) is an international contest for young performers of popular music founded in 2002 by the Russian composer Igor Krutoy and Latvian pianist and composer Raimonds Pauls and later enhanced by the Russian superstar Alla Pugacheva. The contest usually lasts for six days: 3 contest days, 2 special event days and, at the end, the day where the contest's results are announced followed by an ending concert.

Location 

For the first 14 years New Wave was held in the Latvian coastal city of Jūrmala, but in 2015 it moved to Sochi, the Russian Federation (other potential locations included Baku, Kaliningrad, Kazan and Crimea). According to organizer Igor Krutoy, the main reason for relocating was performing Russian singers Valeriya, Iosif Kobzon and Oleg Gazmanov being denied entry into Latvia for the 2014 contest by Minister of Foreign Affairs Edgars Rinkēvičs because of their voiced support for Russia's annexation of Crimea.

Participants 

Although meant to popularize new stars from all over Europe, the countries of the former USSR and the USA, many present and former superstars play an important, if not the most important, role in it. Many participants have also represented their countries at the Junior Eurovision Song Contest, including but not limited to: Helena Meraai (Belarus), Gaia Cauchi (Malta), Marta Kirakosyan (Armenia), Ela Mangion (Malta),  Daneliya Tuleshova (Kazakhstan), Krisia Todorova (Bulgaria), Lerika Engalycheva (Russia and Moldova), Anahit Adamyan (Armenia), Polina Bogusevich (Russia), Misha Gregoryan (Armenia), Anastasiya Baginska (Ukraine), Dino Jelusić (Croatia) and Daniel Yastremski (Belarus). New Wave contestants have also represented their country at the Eurovision Song Contest including Jamala (Ukraine), DoReDos (Moldova), Natalia Gordienko (Moldova), Demy (Greece) and Saro Gevorgyan (Armenia; as a backing vocalist).

Winners

See also 
Jurmala Young Pop Singer Competition
Armenia in the New Wave competition

References

External links 

 Official website of the New Wave Contest 
 Official website of the Junior New Wave Contest 

 
Jūrmala
Music competitions in Latvia
Singing competitions
2002 establishments in Latvia